is a Japanese motorbike racing-themed manga series written and illustrated by Shuichi Shigeno. It was serialized in Kodansha's shōnen manga magazine Weekly Shōnen Magazine from 1983 to 1991, with its chapters collected in 38 tankōbon volumes.

Earlier parts of the story focus both on high school life as well as street racing. At first the characters are illegal street racers (Japanese: hashiriya) that race on public roads, particularly on the winding mountain roads known as tōge. Those kind of racers were called "rolling-zoku", a type of bōsōzoku, and were seen as a social problem in Japan. Later parts of the story revolve around professional motorcycle racing events held on road circuits like the All Japan Road Race Championship.

A two-episode original video animation (OVA) adaptation produced by Pierrot, "Part I: Tsukuba Arc" and "Part II: Suzuka Arc", was released in 1986. The episodes were later re-edited and released in theaters in August 1987 by Nippon Herald (now part of Kadokawa Pictures).

In 1985, it won the ninth Kodansha Manga Award for the shōnen category.

Characters

A motorcycle racer. He rides a Honda CB750 as well as a Suzuki GSX-R.

Gun's girlfriend.

Gun's friendly rival. He rides a Suzuki Katana.

Gun's best friend. He rides a Kawasaki Z400GP.

The daughter of the Ichinose Racing Team president. She is in love with Hiro. Miyuki rides a Honda VT250F.

Hideyoshi's sister. She lost her parents in car accident.

Media

Manga
Written and illustrated by Shuichi Shigeno, Bari Bari Densetsu was serialized in Kodansha's Weekly Shōnen Magazine from March 9, 1983, to July 17, 1991. Kodansha collected its chapters in thirty-eight tankōbon volumes, released from October 14, 1983, to August 6, 1991.

Reception
In 1985, it won the ninth Kodansha Manga Award for the shōnen category.

References

External links

1986 anime OVAs
1989 video games
Kodansha manga
Japanese auto racing films
Japan-exclusive video games
Motorcycle video games
Motorsports in anime and manga
School life in anime and manga
Taito games
TurboGrafx-16 games
TurboGrafx-16-only games
Winner of Kodansha Manga Award (Shōnen)
Shōnen manga
Pierrot (company)
Video games developed in Japan